JCNetwork e.V. is one of two governing bodies among German student consultancies. The registered association features the cooperation as well as the sharing of experiences among 41 student consultancies throughout Germany.  More than 2,600 students are organized in the student consultancies. In addition to receiving a university education, the students give advice to companies and nonprofit organizations through projects that are planned and implemented by the students themselves.

History
JCNetwork e.V. was founded by seven student consultancies in 2002. Shortly after its foundation, many more association members joined the Network. Today, there are 41 participating university consultancies all over Germany.

JCNetwork Days
One year after the foundation, the association organized the so-called JCNetwork Days for the first time. The JCNetwork Days is a week-long biannual meeting of the governing body consisting of numerous workshops and training events. The purpose of this meeting is the continuing education of the members through training as well as the establishment of valuable contacts between student consultants and companies. Representatives of several companies, students, professors and faculty members meet for discussions and training events. The assembly of the JCNetwork members and the report of the managing committee is also on the agenda of the JCNetwork Days. More than 500 students are regularly attending these meetings nowadays.

Continuing Education and JCNetwork Certified Junior Consultant Program
At the end of 2002, the JCNetwork association introduced its own system of education and continuing training. Since then, the students have received credit points for attending the training events which are conducted by companies or members of the governing body. Students who have gathered enough credit points in different subject areas and who are able to show experience in consulting, receive the title "Certified Junior Consultant".

Charitable Projects
With the "JCNetwork pro Bono" initiative, JCNetwork supports charitable organizations by offering free advice. With the help and cooperation of professional economic consultancies, students work on creating valuable solutions for charity and charitable organizations.

References

External links
 jcnetwork.de

Organizations established in 2002
Student organisations in Germany
2002 establishments in Germany